Brigada explosiva contra los ninjas (English: Explosive Brigade Against the Ninjas) is a 1986 Argentine adventure comedy film directed by Miguel Fernández Alonso and written by Salvador Valverde Calvo. The film starred Moria Casán and Emilio Disi. It is a sequel to the Argentine film Brigada explosiva (1986).

Other cast
Moria Casán: Margarita Zavaleta
Emilio Disi: Emilio
Gino Renni: Gino Foderone
Berugo Carámbula: Benito
Daniel Guerrero: Macarius
Mario Castiglione: Sergeant
Tincho Zabala: Don Genaro
Alberto Fernández de Rosa: Alberto Rosales
Edgardo Mesa: Boxing announcer
Anamá Ferreyra
Isidoro Chiodi
Carlos Roffé: Yoga professor

External links

 
 Culto Zeta Film information

1986 films
1980s Spanish-language films
1980s adventure comedy films
Argentine adventure comedy films
Japan in non-Japanese culture
1980s Argentine films